Clube Ferroviário de Maputo is a women's basketball club based in Maputo, Mozambique. The team competes in the Mozambican League. The team is one of the most decorated teams on the continent, having won the FIBA Africa Women's Clubs Champions Cup two times (2018 and 2019).

History 
Ferroviário de Maputo was founded in 1924 and is operated by the country's national railway organisation.

In 2018, Ferroviário won their maiden title, and their country's sixth title overall, by edging out the five-time champions Interclube of Angola, 59–56, in the finals. A year later, in 2019, Maputo won its second title after defeating record holder Interclube once again in the final, 91–90 after overtime. Ingvild Mucauro was named the competition's MVP.

Honours
FIBA Africa Women's Clubs Champions Cup
 Champions (2): 2018, 2019
 Runners-up (3): 2006, 2016, 2017
 Third place (2): 2015, 2022

References

Basketball teams in Mozambique
Clube Ferroviário de Maputo
Basketball teams established in 1924
Sport in Maputo